Mike King Tonight is a New Zealand late-night talk show hosted by mental health advocate and at the time a comedian, Mike King that aired for one season in 2003. It aired on TV2.

Background 
The show was a general late-night talk show that was filmed in front of a live studio audience at the Bruce Mason Centre in Takapuna, New Zealand. King was the host for the show with various special guests on each episode. The show was funded by NZ on Air.

References 

New Zealand television talk shows
TVNZ 2 original programming
2000s New Zealand television series
2003 New Zealand television series debuts
2003 New Zealand television series endings
Television series by Greenstone TV